The 1978 Nations Cup, also known by its sponsored name Ambre Solaire Nations Cup, was a men's team tennis tournament played on outdoor clay courts. It was the second edition of the Nations Cup and the event was part of the 1978 Grand Prix circuit. It took place at the Rochusclub in Düsseldorf in West Germany from 8 May through 15 May 1978. Total prize money was £100,000 and in total 36,000 people attended the event. The United States were the defending champions. Spain defeated Australia in the final, watched by a crowd of nearly 7,000, to win the title for the first time and earn the $60,000 first-prize money.

The draw consisted of eight teams divided over two round-robin groups. The two best ranked teams from each group proceeded to the semifinals. Each match consisted of two singles and a doubles.

Players

Section A

Hans Gildemeister
Jaime Fillol 
Patricio Cornejo

 Rolf Gehring
 Jürgen Fassbender
 Uli Pinner

Paolo Bertolucci
Adriano Panatta
Antonio Zugarelli

José Higueras
Manuel Orantes

Section B

Phil Dent
John Newcombe

John Lloyd
Buster Mottram

Wojciech Fibak
Tadeusz Nowicki

Bob Lutz
Harold Solomon
Roscoe Tanner

Round robin

Section A

Standings

Spain vs. Germany

Italy vs. Chile

Chile vs. Germany

Italy vs. Spain

Italy vs. Germany

Spain vs. Chile

Section B

Standings

USA vs. Australia

Great Britain vs. Poland

USA vs. Poland

Australia vs. Great Britain

USA vs. Great Britain

Australia vs. Poland

Semifinal

Australia vs. Italy

Spain vs. USA

Final

Spain vs. Australia

See also
 1978 Davis Cup

External links
 1978 Nations Cup Results itftennis.com

References

Nations Cup
Nations Cup
World Team Cup